Rabeh Oskouie is an Iranian film and Television actress. She started theater training under the supervision of Iranian theater director Hamid Samandarian.

Filmography
 2020 - Tweezers (TV series)
 2019 – Gando (TV series)
 2014 – I'm just kidding (TV Series)
 2012 – Bidar Bash (TV Series)
 2011 – Facing Mirrors as Nurse 
 2011 – Crime and Punishment (TV movie) 
 2010 – Poopak and Mash Mashallah  
 2008 – Shirin as herself
 2006 – Chap dast (The Left-handed)
 2001 – Killing Mad Dogs 1999 – Once Upon a Time 1998 – Divorce Iranian Style 1994 – Excuse me'' (TV Series)

References

External links

Iranian film actresses
Iranian television actresses
Living people
20th-century Iranian actresses
21st-century Iranian actresses
People from Tehran
1966 births